DWDR (105.5 FM), broadcasting as DPR Radio 105.5, is a radio station owned and operated by the Sorsogon Provincial Disaster Risk Reduction and Management Office. Its studios & transmitter are located at Flores St., Capitol Compound, Brgy. Burabod, Sorsogon City.

References

Radio stations in Sorsogon